Tribe is a television program which is produced and aired on Net 25 which airs every Sundays at 5:00-5:30 PM Philippine Standard Time. It premiered on March 25, 2006, and ended on August 3, 2019.

See also
List of programs broadcast by Net 25

External links
Tribe's official website at Net 25

2006 Philippine television series debuts
Filipino-language television shows
Net 25 original programming
Philippine television shows